College Avenue Gymnasium is an athletic facility on the College Avenue Campus of Rutgers University in New Brunswick, New Jersey.

It is the second gymnasium built on the site.  The first was built in 1892 on the site of College Field, the former RU football field.  The first collegiate game of American football was played on the site on November 6, 1869, with Rutgers beating Princeton University, 6–4 (roughly 42–28 under today's scoring).

The old Ballantine Gymnasium burned down in 1930, and this replacement building opened in 1932.  Officially, it is the College Avenue Gymnasium, but it is known to the RU community as "The Barn."  Most of the seating is in the form of a balcony on three sides, upstairs from the court level, giving the gym one of the most intimate settings in Eastern college basketball while it was RU's main venue for the sport.  Seating capacity has been approximately 3,200 throughout its existence. There is an annex attached to the side of the gym that sport courts for basketball, indoor soccer and a variety of other sports. The Barn has a rock climbing wall and provides willing students with lessons. The Barn also has a room used solely for those interested in kickboxing or mixed martial arts in general. There is also a room with multiple Olympic weightlifting platforms complete bumper plates, which are in kilograms, for both beginners and advanced lifters. Both the kickboxing room and the Olympic weightlifting room are deemed "The Power Gym" and are located off of The Barn's main weight-room.

Rutgers reached its only NCAA Final Four in the 1975–76 season, going undefeated until losing to the University of Michigan in the National Semifinal.  Home games at The Barn became festive affairs, with the crowd yelling so loudly that paint chips fell from the ceiling.  RU knew it was time to build a bigger home court, and the Rutgers Athletic Center was built across the Raritan River in Piscataway in time for the 1977–78 season.  It was renamed the Louis Brown Athletic Center in 1986, and subsequently became Jersey Mike's Arena in 2021.

The College Avenue Gym remains the home of RU's volleyball team, as well as gym facilities for students, and there are no plans to replace it. Besides volleyball, their most recent tenant was the Rutgers Wrestling team for a practice location, as well as their home arena, but moved over to the RWJBarnabas Health Athletic Performance Center in September of 2019.

The current New Jersey State Constitution was written and adopted in a constitutional convention, led by Rutgers President Robert Clarkson Clothier, held here in 1947.

References

External links
 

Rutgers Scarlet Knights basketball venues
College volleyball venues in the United States
College wrestling venues in the United States
Defunct college basketball venues in the United States
1932 establishments in New Jersey
Sports venues completed in 1932
Gyms in the United States
Sports in New Brunswick, New Jersey